Espuny is a surname. Notable people with the surname include:

Cristopher Espuny (born 1994), Spanish-born Dominican footballer
Miguel Báez Espuny (born 1930), Spanish bullfighter 

Catalan-language surnames